Granby Mill Village Historic District is a national historic district located at Columbia, South Carolina.  The district encompasses 97 contributing buildings associated with a cotton mill and associated mill village. The mill was initially constructed in 1896–1897, and is a large four-story, rectangular brick building in the Romanesque Revival style.  It features two projecting five-story entrance towers. The Granby Mill Village includes a number of "saltbox" style dwellings reminiscent of a New England mill village. The district also includes the mill gatehouse, the two-story mill office building (c. 1902), commercial buildings, the Gothic Revival style Whaley Street Methodist Church, and operatives' houses.

It was added to the National Register of Historic Places in 1993.

References

External links 
 Granby Mill apartments

Historic districts on the National Register of Historic Places in South Carolina
Romanesque Revival architecture in South Carolina
Gothic Revival architecture in South Carolina
Buildings and structures in Columbia, South Carolina
National Register of Historic Places in Columbia, South Carolina
Cotton mills in the United States